Killen is a small remote rural hamlet, located 2 miles northwest of Avoch and Fortrose, in the Black Isle, Ross-shire, Scottish Highlands and is in the Scottish council area of Highland. It has a road going straight through the middle and a wonderful wood.

References

Hamlets in Scotland
Populated places on the Black Isle